The Ninth Bridgewater Treatise was published by Charles Babbage in 1837 as a response to the eight Bridgewater Treatises that the Earl of Bridgewater, Francis Henry Egerton, 8th Earl, had funded and in particular with reference to a comment in one of them by William Whewell.

The book is a work of natural theology, and incorporates extracts from related correspondence of Herschel with Charles Lyell. Babbage put forward the thesis that God had the omnipotence and foresight to create as a divine legislator.  In this book, Babbage dealt with relating interpretations between science and religion; on the one hand, he insisted that "there exists no fatal collision between the words of Scripture and the facts of nature;" on the one hand, he wrote the Book of Genesis was not meant to be read literally in relation to geological terms. Against those who said these were in conflict, he wrote "that the contradiction they have imagined can have no real existence, and that whilst the testimony of Moses remains unimpeached, we may also can be permitted to confide in the testimony of our senses."

Babbage also defends the belief in miracles, in his Chapter VIII, where he states:

See also 
 Charles Babbage#Religious views

References

 

Charles Babbage
Philosophy of religion literature
Philosophy of science books
Modern philosophical literature
Treatises